Canciones Para Un Paraíso En Vivo is the fourth live album by Spanish singer-songwriter Alejandro Sanz. It was recorded in Madrid on July 5, 2010. The album, released in digipack format, contains a CD with a selection of 10 tracks of the concert with one bonus track and a DVD with all 17 live performance. Sanz performed some of his old classic songs like "No Es Lo Mismo", "Corazón Partío" along with a medley and the entire Paraíso Express album except "Pero Esta Tarde No Te Vas" and "Tú No Tienes La Culpa". It also include a duet with Spanish singer-songwriter Joaquín Sabina on Sanz's latest single, "Lola Soledad", as a bonus track.

Track listing

CD 

 Mi Peter Punk
 Lo Que Fui Es Lo Que Soy
 Desde cuando
 Viviendo deprisa
 Corazón partío
 Cuando Nadie Me Ve
 Hice llorar hasta Los Ángeles
 Nuestro amor será leyenda
 Lola soledad
 Looking for paradise

Bonus Track
 Lola soledad – feat. Joaquín Sabina (Bonus Track)

DVD 

 Mi Peter Punk
 Lo Que Fui Es Lo Que Soy
 Desde Cuando
 Viviendo Deprisa
 Nuestro Amor Sera Leyenda
 Corazon Partio
 Cuando Nadie Me Ve
 Yo Hice Llorar Hasta a Los Angeles
 Para Que Tu No Llores
 Sin Que Se Note
 Si Hay Dios
 Lola Soledad
 Aquello Que Me Diste
 Mala
 No Es Lo Mismo
 Looking For Paradise
 Medley: A La Primera Persona/Mi Soledad y Yo/Amiga Mia/Y si fuera ella?

Personnel 
 Luis Aquino – Trumpet
 Mike Ciro – Director, electric guitar
 Sarah Devine – Background vocals
 Fernando Díaz – Engineer, mixing
 Claudio Divella – Photography
 Luis Dulzaides – Percussion
 Juan Carlos "Diez Pianos" García – Technician
 Selan Lerner – Background vocals, keyboards
 Carlos Martin – Keyboards, percussion, trombone, trumpet
 Alfonso Pérez – Background vocals, electric guitar, keyboards
 Steve Rodríguez – Bass
 Alejandro Sanz – Vocals
 Nathaniel Townsley – Drums
 Javier Vercher – Flute, saxophone

References

 http://www.estereofonica.com/alejandro-sanz-estrena-%E2%80%9Ccanciones-para-un-paraiso-en-vivo/

Alejandro Sanz live albums
2010 live albums